Paul Flora (6 June 1922 – 15 May 2009) was an Austrian caricaturist, graphic artist, and illustrator, known for his black ink line drawings. "Flora was one of Europe's most profiled illustrators since the 1960s. He worked for British newspapers The Times and The Observer as well as for Germany's Die Zeit".

Career 
Flora was born in Glurns, South Tyrol. The young artist spent his formative years in Bavaria, Germany. From 1942 to 1944 Flora studied at the Academy of Fine Arts Munich under the Norwegian draftsman and painter Olaf Gulbransson, who worked for the political magazine Simplicissimus.

"To many observers of the Austrian and German art scene, Paul Flora appears to have weathered many storms on his stony path to becoming well known for his characteristic black ink line drawings. Living in Tyrol, where it is almost impossible for an artist to earn a living solely by selling his artwork, he was one of the few who had achieved sustained success". (R. H. Sachsenmaier: "Paul Flora". In Sast Report, 2013)

He died on 15 May 2009 in Innsbruck and was buried in his hometown Glurns.

Honors 
Asteroid 85411 Paulflora, discovered by Erich Meyer and Erwin Obermair in 1996, was named in his honor. The official  was published by the Minor Planet Center on 30 July 2007.

Exhibitions in museums 
 1950: Biennale in Venedig
 1952: Landesmuseum Ferdinandeum, Innsbruck
 1956: Secession, Vienna
 1959: Kunsthalle Bremen und Maison de France, Berlin
 1963: Wilhelm Busch Museum, Hannover
 1966: Biennale in Venedig
 1972: Suermont Museum, Aachen
 1974: Folkwang Museum, Essen
 1979: Museum Nymwegen
 1984: Museum für Kunst und Gewerbe, Hamburg
 1989: Albrecht-Dürer-Haus, Nürnberg
 1992: Historisches Museum, Vienna 
 1993: Museion, Bozen
 1997: Bayerische Akademie der schönen Künste, Munich 
 2002: Palais Esplanade, Meran 
 2002: Palais Harrach, Vienna
 2021: Abertina, Vienna

Films 
 Die Raben von San Marco 
 Floras Fauna
 Ein Fischer im Drüben 
 Ein Abenteurer im Schlafrock 
 Auf dem Strich – Paul Flora im Film 2007

References and notes

External links 

 
 
 Biography: Paul-Flora-Site (English, German)
 Biography, Photographies, Short story: Sast Report - Culture: Paul Flora (English)
 Galerie im Taxispalais / Innsbruck
 Bleistifte der Härte zwei (Janko Ferk Paul Flora, German)
 Galerie Hofburg / Brixen
 Audiointerview: Paul Flora, ORF, 15. Mai 2009
 Paul Flora (in German) from the archive of the Österreichische Mediathek

1922 births
2009 deaths
Austrian artists
Academy of Fine Arts, Munich alumni
People from Glurns